Chain of Attack is a 1987 Star Trek: The Original Series novel written by Gene DeWeese.

Plot

While mapping gravitational anomalies, the USS Enterprise is hurled millions of light-years off course. They find themselves in a galaxy devastated by war and soon they are under attack by both warring fleets. Captain Kirk risks his ship and crew in order to stop the war and get home.

Reception
Chain of Attack reached 12 on the New York Times bestseller list on February 22, 1987.

Film adaptation
The novel has been adapted into a fan-made film, Star Trek: Infinite Chain, which can be viewed on YouTube.

References

External links

Novels based on Star Trek: The Original Series
1987 American novels
American science fiction novels
Novels by Gene DeWeese
Novels set in the 23rd century